Anton (Antin) Terentiiovych Prykhodko (Ukrainian: Антін Терентійович Приходько; 1891 – January 29, 1938, Arkhangelsk) was a Ukrainian Soviet statesman, born in Kuban Oblast, Tikhoretsky District, Cossack village Novorozhdestvenskaya. He was the Permanent Representative of Ukrainian SSR to the Government of the USSR. He was also the member of VUTsVK.

Biography 
In 1907 — Attended Ukrainian Socialist circle of the high school of Stavropol

Graduated from Stavropol Teacher Seminary

In 1915 — MGU student and Esers' group member

From 1916 — USRP member under the nickname "Professor"

In 1917 (before October Revolution) — First time arrived to Ukrainian land (to Kyiv)

In 1917 —Candidate for members of UCA from USRP with participation of Ukrainian Peasant Union in Poltava constituency

January 16, 1918 —  Arrested together with almost all leaders of left USRP group

From June, 1918 — CP(B)U member

April 29, 1919 — Applied for withdrawal from USRP Central Committee

1919-1920 —  UCP (borotbists) secretary 

June 1919 — UCP (borotbists) Central Committee cashier 

1920-1929 — Chairman of the Board of State Publishing House of Ukraine

1920-1930 —  Secretary of Central Commission of Ukrainization of Soviet apparatus under Council of People's Commissars of the Ukrainian SSR

In 1921

 member of editorial board of critical-bibliographic journal "Voice of Press"
 headed All-Ukrainian Publishing Commission  under Council of People's Commissars of the Ukrainian SSR
 member of VI membership of VUTsVK

End of 1921 - May 1922 — Commissioner from the Poltava Governorate during the mobilization to prepare the sowing campaign in Ukraine

May 1922 - November 1924 — Permanent Representative of Ukrainian SSR to the Government of the USSR (see List of ambassadors of Ukraine to Russia)

September 12, 1922 — Enrolled in 1st course of Karl Marx Moscow Institute of the National Economy

December 1924 - April 1926 —  Adviser to the Permanent Representation of the USSR in Czechoslovakia

January 27, 1926 - 1927 — Deputy Commissar of Education of Ukrainian SSR Alexander Shumsky

1926 -1930 — Deputy General Prosecutor of Ukrainian SSR

1926 — Member of the State Spelling Commission

1927 - December 25, 1929 — Deputy Commissar of Education of Ukrainian SSR Mykola Skrypnyk

May 25 - June 3, 1927 — Conference Member to discuss the draft spelling

1928 — Member of the Presidium of the State Spelling Commission

August 9, 1929 —  He had a party ticket number #0751622 and was recognized as proven by the results of the meeting of the Verification Commission of the Cell of CP(B)U in People's Commissariat for Education of Ukrainian SSR (Zhuravliovskiy district committee, Kharkiv)

March 9, 1930 - April 19, 1930 — Head of the Supreme Court of the Ukrainian SSR during Union for the Freedom of Ukraine process

In 1930-1931 — Executive editor of the journal "Bulletin of Soviet Justice"

In 1931-1933 — Executive editor of the journal "Revolutionary law"

Until December 31, 1933 — Chairman of the Arbitration Commission under Council of People's Commissars of the Ukrainian SSR

December 31, 1933

 Excluded from CP(B)U for insincerity in giving explanations to CP(B)U Central Control Commission about the connection with the counter-revolutionary, nationalist element
 Arrested by OGPU of USSR in Kharkiv (10 appt, 49 Pushkinskaya str.) as a member and leader of the Kharkiv terrorist organisation and a member of the counter-revolutionary Ukrainian rebel organisation that set as its goal the overthrow of Soviet power by force of arms

June 4, 1934 — Convicted for 10 years of corrective labor by judicial group of three of OGPU of USSR (Criminal Code of Ukrainian SSR, article 54-11)

July 1934 - End of 1936 — stayed on the island Vaigach (Amderma bay)

January -  November 1937 — stayed at Chibyu

November 1937 — wrote the last letter to his wife (she received it January 1938)

December 21, 1937 — sentenced to capital punishment by troika of NKVD Directorate of Arkhangelskaya Oblast (Criminal Code of RSFSR, articles 58-10, 58-11)

January 29, 1938 — shot together with Ivan Shchepkin, Nikolay Muzychenko, and Vladimir Ivanov

December 6, 1957 —  rehabilitated by the Military Court of the Kyiv Military District

Writings 
He wrote under a pseudonym "A. Pryideshnii".

 What was the sea noisy about // Journal "Shliakhy Mystetstva". — 1921. — part 1. — pp. 31–32
 The birth of the sun // Journal "Shliakhy Mystetstva". — 1921. — part 1. — pp. 32
 Fatigue // Journal "Mystetstvo". — 1919. — #4. — pp. 13–14
 Arrest of ten // Almanac "Zhshytky Borotby". — 1920. — pp. 34–55

Articles 

 Cultural and educational issues at the Xth Congress of the CP(b)U //  Bilshovyk Ukrayiny . — 1927. — #14. — pp. 17–26
SVU on school front // Shlyakh osvity. — 1931. — ##5-6. — pp. 82–90
 General education in Ukraine // Radianska Osvita. — 1928. — #10. — pp. 1–15
Hnat Mykhailychenko // Hnat Mykhailychenko. Works of art  — 1929. — pp. 5–15

Personal life 
He had brother Fedir Prykhodko

Winter 1918-1919 —  was a guest at the wedding of Vasil Matena-Bugaievich (Chornyi) and Mariia Moskovets (sister of Yevhenia Moskovets) together with his wife, Maria (Marusia) Prykhodko (Bocharova). The wedding took place 24 Babichevskii lane (Zhelvakova str.), Poltava

March 2, 1920 — his wife, Maria Prykhodko, was a member of UCP (borotbists) and employee of its Central Committee

1926 — his wife, Maria Prykhodko, started to work as an announcer of All-Ukrainian Radio-broadcasting Committee

May 6, 1927 — lived at the address 5 room, 8 Sadovo-Kulikovskaya str.,

In 1929-1930 — lived at the address 1 Revoliutsii str., Kharkiv

1933 — lived at the address 10 appt., 49 Pushkinskaya str., Kharkiv ("Kommunar" building)

January 1934 — his wife, Maria Prykhodko, was fired from  All-Ukrainian Radio-broadcasting Committee

Annotations

References 

 Message from the former Deputy Prosecutor General of the Ukrainian SSR to the head of the republican GPU
 Anton Terentyevich Prikhodko. Documents
 11/13/1924: Album from the Ukrainian Embassy in the USSR
 Center for genealogical research
 Academician A.N. Sokolovsky and other prosecutors and judges who participated in the ULU (SVU) trial (based on the materials of the State Political Department of the People’s Commissariat of Internal Affairs and the court records)
 Forgotten writers of "Executed Renaissance"
 Prykhodko Anton Terentyevich (1892)
Mykhailo Poloz –  USSR co-founder that was shot in Sandromakh
Unknown pioneers of Ukrainian Radio. Prykhodko family.

1891 births
1938 deaths
People from Tikhoretsky District
People from Kuban Oblast
20th-century Ukrainian lawyers
Ukrainian prosecutors
Soviet lawyers
Union for the Freedom of Ukraine trial
Great Purge victims from Russia
Soviet rehabilitations
Ukrainian writers
Borotbists
Ukrainian educators
Ukrainian editors
Executed Renaissance
Radio in Ukraine